Caesar Andrade Faini (April 15, 1913 – 1995) was a master Ecuadorian painter and teacher who studied at the School of Fine Arts of Quito under the painter Victor Mideros.

Early life
Faini was born in Quito, Ecuador. His initial work focused on Social Realism like his contemporaries Eduardo Kingman.
Faini is often considered the best interpreter of Ecuador's coastal landscape.

Painting
Faini's works bear the usual characteristics of the ideas of Social Realism, the prevalent theme of his generation. Other notable contemporaries included Eduardo Kingman, Bolívar Mena Franco, Oswaldo Guayasamín and Diogenes Paredes.

Faini graduated in 1937, writing a thesis entitled 'Social Misery'.

Faini moved to different places to infuse his work with new themes, gathering new influences along the way. He first went to Panama, where he mostly made murals. In 1943, he moved to Guayaquil. It was there that he began to create works that were expressionistic, a change brought about by the strong influence of Hans Michaelson. Faini fell in love with the city. He married while he was in Guayaquil.

Influence
In 1954 Faini succeeded Michaelson as the director of Guayaquil's Municipal School of Art. During his directorship he mentored numerous students who would later go on to become famous artists. These included Theo Constanté, Luis Miranda, José Carreño and Juan Villafuerte.

The fifties also marked a shift in Faini's style. Peculiar characteristics emerged in his works during this period, but they continued to bear his unique spiritual and poetic inspiration.

Awards and prizes
 1957 - First Prize Acquisition - Mariano Aguilera
 1959 - Third Prize - Hall October, Guayaquil, Ecuador
 1961 - Hall October - House of Culture, Quito, Ecuador

References

 Municipalidad de Guayaquil
 Biography

1913 births
1995 deaths
Ecuadorian painters
Modern painters